Jean-Marie Pallardy is a French movie director.

He first worked as a male model in the 1960s, before opting for a career change and directing softcore erotic pictures. He also tried his hand at crime fiction and adventure films, with mixed results. His most ambitious project to date is White Fire (1984), starring Robert Ginty and Fred Williamson, a movie which has proved to be quite popular among camp aficionados. Pallardy's career dwindled in the 1980s, with the decline of France's exploitation cinema, and his movies became few and far between. His last movie to date, The Donor, guest-starring David Carradine, was released straight to DVD in 2004.

External links
Nanarland Biography of Jean-Marie Pallardy, his recurrent actors, reviews of his films and other media (in french) 

French film directors
Living people
Year of birth missing (living people)